Star Trader is a 1974 video game and an early example of the space trading genre. The game involves players moving from star to star on a map of the galaxy, buying and selling quantities of six types of merchandise in a competition to make the most money. The game was developed by Dave Kaufman for computers in 1973, and its BASIC source code was printed in the January 1974 issue of the People's Computer Company Newsletter. It was reprinted in the 1977 book What to Do After You Hit Return. The game was the inspiration for the multiplayer Trade Wars series, beginning in 1984, and is thought to be the antecedent to much of the space trading genre.

Gameplay 

Star Trader is a multiplayer space trading game, in which players trade resources between star systems in order to make the most money. The game presents a star map of the galaxy in which each player moves about trading between star systems of different levels of economic development. The players travel from planet to planet buying and selling six types of merchandise: uranium, metals, gems, software, heavy equipment, and medicine. The different levels of planet have different needs and produce different kinds and amounts of goods, which influences their prices. In the course of the game the level of development of planets can improve and new planetary systems can be discovered. Haggling over the price of goods is a central part of gameplay. The game's interface is text-only.

Development
Star Trader was written by Dave Kaufman in the BASIC programming language. The source code to the game was published in the People's Computer Company Newsletter in volume 2, issue 3 in January 1974. The concept for the game is seemingly based on Isaac Asimov's Foundation series of novels.

Legacy
In 1977, the game's code was reprinted in What to Do After You Hit Return. Star Trader was used as the inspiration for the first game of the Trade Wars series of multiplayer space trading games in 1984, making it the ancestor of many subsequent space trader games, including Eve Online, the Wing Commander Privateer series, and Elite series.

Several unrelated but similar space trading games have been released under the name Star Trader. One such game was released by Bug Byte Software in 1984 for the ZX Spectrum and Commodore 64, and was one of the games included with the Softaid compilation. Another was written by S. J. Singer in 1984 using Altair Basic, and modified by John Zaitseff for Microsoft Basic under the CP/M-80 operating system in 1988.  Completely rewritten versions for CP/M-80, CP/M-86, MS-DOS, Microsoft Windows 3.1 and Linux/Unix followed, with the latest release for Linux and Unix occurring in November 2019.  All versions by John Zaitseff have been released or relicensed under the GNU General Public License v3.

References

External links
The People's Computer Company Alumni Pages People's Computer Company Alumni and History site.
Standard HP BASIC Listing #1 Star Trader Game Setup Module BASIC programming language listing.
Standard HP BASIC Listing #2 Star Trader Game Main Module BASIC programming language listing.
Star Trader Tribute Page Site describing the history of Star Trader.
History Of Trade Wars Variants Timeline of the history of Trade Wars variants.
Star Traders Versions of Star Traders for Linux, as well as for CP/M-80, CP/M-86, MS-DOS, Windows 3.1 and Commodore 64.

1974 video games
Space trading and combat simulators
Public-domain software with source code
Video games developed in the United States